Karl Storz SE & Co. KG is a German medical device company that manufactures and sells endoscopes and surgical instruments. It was founded in Tuttlingen by Dr. Karl Storz in 1945.  The company is privately owned; Storz' daughter, Sybill, took over running the company after Storz died in 1996.

The company was one of the first to introduce an endoscope that delivered light using fiber optics, in 1963.  It also licensed the patent for the Hopkins relay lens and introduced endoscopes including such lenses in 1965.

As of 2012 it employed around 5,800 people worldwide and had annual sales of around 1 billion euros.

In 2017, it was the subject of several lawsuits concerning deaths following use of morcellators that it sold; in 2014 the FDA had advised that these devices should be withdrawn from the market due to the risk of spreading cancer and while Ethicon, the market leader, had withdrawn their devices, Karl Storz had not. In 2017, it changed its corporate form from GmbH to Societas Europaea.

It has a US subsidiary called Karl Storz Endoscopy-America, Inc. that was founded in 1971, and a group focused on industrial products like borescopes called Karl Storz Industrial Group.

KARL STORZ Endoscopy Canada Ltd. was established in December 1995 to offer Canadian customers even more direct support.

In 2019, Karl-Christian Storz took over the management of the operational business and his mother Sybill Storz became head of the supervisory board. In the years after 2000, Sybill Storz received a number of awards for her entrepreneurial achievements and her social commitment.

Company data 
In addition to the headquarters in Tuttlingen, the company manufactures in seven other production facilities. More than 8,000 employees in 47 sales and marketing companies are employed worldwide, around 3,000 of them at the headquarters in Tuttlingen. Up to 150 apprentices are trained in twelve professions. The company's total turnover in 2018 was over 1.75 billion euros.

Karl Storz SE & Co. KG is a member of the Industrial Association of Baden.

References

Further reading

External links
 Official website

Medical technology companies of Germany
Companies based in Baden-Württemberg